Centesimus Annus Pro Pontifice (CAPP) (it: Fondazione Centesimus Annus – Pro Pontifice) is a pontifical foundation.

Pope John Paul II established the "Fondazione Centesimus Annus - Pro Pontifice" on 13 June 1993 along with lay Catholic business, academic and professional leaders. The Foundation is a lay-led non-profit organisation. Its purpose is to promote the Catholic social doctrine, especially as expressed in the encyclical Centesimus Annus (1991) and the aims of the Apostolic See. It is headquartered in the state of Vatican City. The organization is subject to the civil law of Vatican City and the canon law of the Church.

Beginning in 2013, every two years the foundation has bestowed the Economy and Society International Prize on a "work which stands out for its original contribution to in depth study and implementation of the Social Doctrine of the Church". Recipients have been:

2013:  and 
2015: 
2017: 
2019: 
2021:  and

References

External links 
 
 Website of CAPP-USA
 YouTube/Rome Reports: Centesimus Annus, a foundation to bring justice to the worlds economy
 YouTube/CAPP TV: See, Judge, Act 3 Principles that Can Change the World

Pontifical organizations
Catholic social teaching
International non-profit organizations
Educational foundations